All Along (7 April 1979 – 23 February 2005) was a champion Thoroughbred racemare that was foaled in France. She was one of the top fillies of the last part of the 20th century, racing mostly in Europe. All Along was named into the National Museum of Racing and Hall of Fame in 1990 and the Canadian Horse Racing Hall of Fame in 2019. Her only winning offspring was the Mill Reef sired colt Along All who won the Prix Greffulhe Group 2 of 1989 and was to spend his time as a sire in Japan.

Background
A granddaughter of Round Table, she was owned by Daniel Wildenstein (1917–2001), the French art dealer. All Along was trained in France, first by Maurice Zilber (1981) and for the remainder of her career by Patrick-Louis Biancone.

Racing career

1981: Two-year-old season
As a two-year-old, the filly raced only one time and won.

1982: Three-year-old season
The following year, she competed on turf courses in France, England, and in Japan, winning numerous prestigious races.

1983: Four-year-old season
In 1983 All Along finished third to Zalataia in the Grand Prix de Chantilly but then finished seventh of the nine runners when favourite for the Grand Prix de Saint-Cloud. After a summer break she returned for the Prix Foy at Longchamp Racecourse. Biancone decided to change the tactics used on the filly and instructed her jockey to hold up the filly for a late run. She made up a great deal of ground in the closing stages to finish second, a length behind the British-trained filly Time Charter.

Ridden by jockey Walter Swinburn, All Along started at odds of 17.3/1 France's most famous race, the Prix de l'Arc de Triomphe. She was held up until the straight when she was produced with a strong run along the rail, catching the leader Sun Princess in the last 100 metres and winning by a length. Luth Enchantee beat Time Charter in a photograph for third, meaning that fillies filled the first four places. She was immediately shipped to Toronto, Ontario, Canada and won the Rothmans International at Woodbine Racetrack. Two weeks later, she won the Turf Classic at Aqueduct Racetrack in Jamaica, New York by 8¾ lengths, then won the Washington, D.C. International Stakes at Laurel, Maryland. Four consecutive wins against the best horses in the world all occurred within 41 days. She was the first horse to win the three prestigious North American races in a row, netting a million-dollar bonus for her owners and Horse of the Year honors in both France and the United States.

She was voted the Eclipse Award for Outstanding Female Turf Horse and became the first filly to win the Eclipse Award for Horse of the Year since the voting system had been implemented in the 1970s.

1984: Five-year-old season
In 1984, she competed in only four races, including a close second in the inaugural Breeders' Cup Turf.

Stud record
All Along retired as a broodmare to the Three Chimneys Farm in Midway, Kentucky. 
She was the dam of:
 1998 bay filly,  Armure Royale by Woodman
 1993 filly, Arutua by Riverman
 1988 filly, All Dancing by Dancing Brave

She died in 2005 and was buried in the cemetery at the Old Bradley Place division of Three Chimneys Farm.

Assessment
All Along was inducted in the National Museum of Racing and Hall of Fame in 1990 and the Canadian Horse Racing Hall of Fame in 2019. In the Blood-Horse magazine ranking of the top 100 U.S. Thoroughbred champions of the 20th Century, All Along was ranked #68.

 All Along was inbred 4 × 4 to the stallion Prince Rose, meaning that the latter appears twice in the fourth generation of her pedigree.

References

 Women of the Year - Ten Fillies Who Achieved Horse Racing's Highest Honor by the Staff and Correspondents of The Blood-Horse magazine (2004) Eclipse Press 

1979 racehorse births
2005 racehorse deaths
Racehorses bred in Calvados (department)
Racehorses trained in France
American Thoroughbred Horse of the Year
United States Thoroughbred Racing Hall of Fame inductees
Arc winners
Eclipse Award winners
Thoroughbred family 1-d
Canadian Horse Racing Hall of Fame inductees